The Tannu-Ola mountains (Tañdı-Uula,  – Tangdy-Uula mountains; , Tağnîn nurú) is a mountain range in southern Siberia, in the Tuva Republic of Russia. It extends in an east–west direction and curves along the Mongolian border. Its highest peak reaches . The Tannu-ola mountains are mentioned in the 13th-century text The Secret History of the Mongols under the name "Tanglu mountains" (唐麓), and also in the JāmiʿAl-tawārīkh of Rashid-al-Din Hamadani (1247–1318) under the name "Toungat mountains" (تنغات). By the Qing dynasty the name has been changed to Tangnu (唐努) mountains, from which the modern name is derived. All names are probably rooted in the old Turkic word taŋ - "wonder, awe, wondrous."

Geography 
The northern slopes are part of the watershed of the Yenisei River, facing the western Sayan Mountains. The eastern end touches the large watershed of the Selenge River in Mongolia.
The foothills of the southern slopes cross into Mongolian territory. They form the northern limits of a large basin of steppes that extends south to the Mongolian Altay Mountains and includes the salt lake Uvs Nuur. The western end is located near the northern Altay Mountains in the Russian Altai Republic.

See also
Tuva Depression
Uvs Nuur Basin
Ubsunur Hollow Biosphere Reserve

References

Mountain ranges of Russia
Mountain ranges of Mongolia
Landforms of Tuva
South Siberian Mountains